Muhammad Taufiq bin Ghani (born 19 November 1989) is a Singaporean football player who plays for Geylang International in the S.League.

Club career
In 2013, Taufiq played for Geylang International. In 2014, he played for Woodlands Wellington. After playing for Hougang for the 2015 season, Taufiq has since returned to Geylang International in 2016.

References

External links
Singapore - T. Ghani - Profile with news, career statistics and history - Soccerway

Singaporean footballers
Hougang United FC players
Geylang International FC players
Woodlands Wellington FC players
Singapore Premier League players
Association football midfielders
1989 births
Living people